Fontamara is a 1980 Italian film, directed by Carlo Lizzani based on the novel of the same name by Ignazio Silone. It stars Michele Placido in the role of Berardo Viola and Antonella Murgia as Elvira. Ida Di Benedetto won the Nastro d'Argento (Silver Ribbon) for Best supporting Actress in 1981 for her supporting role as Maria Rosa.

Plot
In 1929 in Abruzzo, in the mountain villages of Pescina and Fontamara, near Avezzano, the people are subjugated by the arrival of a team of fascists. The militiamen prove hostile, preventing citizens from obtaining supplies necessary to survive the imminent winter. The small Berardo is shocked by the rape of his mother by a fascist officer, and is forced to go to Rome, meditating revenge. Ten years later Berardo in fact, now that he has become large, goes back from Rome in Abruzzo, and discovers that the country is still victim of abuse of fascism. The young communist tries to attack squadrons, but is murdered.

Cast
Michele Placido – Berardo Viola
Ida Di Benedetto – Maria Rosa
Imma Piro – Maria Grazia
Antonella Murgia – Elvira

External links
 http://www.filmscoop.it/film_al_cinema/fontamara.asp

References

1980 films
Italian drama films
1980s Italian-language films
Films set in Abruzzo
Films directed by Carlo Lizzani
Films about fascists
Films set in Pescara
Films shot in Pescara
1980s Italian films